José Antonio Peteiro Freire (20 July 1936 – 25 March 2010) was a Spanish-born Moroccan Roman Catholic prelate, who served as the third Archbishop of the Roman Catholic Archdiocese of Tanger from 2 July 1983 until his retirement on 23 March 2005. He was a member of the Franciscan order (O.F.M.)

Peteiro Freire died as the Archbishop Emeritus of Tanger in Santiago de Compostella, Spain, on 25 March 2010, at the age of 73. He was born in Vilasantar, Galicia.

See also

References

External links

Catholic Hierarchy: Archbishop José Antonio Peteiro Freire, O.F.M. †

1936 births
2010 deaths
21st-century Roman Catholic archbishops in Morocco
Spanish Friars Minor
People from Galicia (Spain)
People from Tangier
20th-century Roman Catholic archbishops in Morocco
Roman Catholic archbishops of Tanger
Moroccan Roman Catholic archbishops